Estakhruiyeh or Estakhruyeh may refer to:
 Estakhruiyeh, Arzuiyeh, Kerman Province
 Estakhruiyeh, Baft, Kerman Province
 Estakhruiyeh, Kerman, Kerman Province
 Estakhruyeh, Yazd